In computer science a for-loop or for loop  is a control flow statement for specifying iteration. Specifically, a for loop functions by running a section of code repeatedly until a certain condition has been satisfied. 

For-loops have two parts: a header and a body. The header defines the iteration and the body is the code that is executed once per iteration. The header often declares an explicit loop counter or loop variable. This allows the body to know which iteration is being executed. For-loops are typically used when the number of iterations is known before entering the loop. For-loops can be thought of as shorthands for while-loops which increment and test a loop variable.

Various keywords are used to indicate the usage of a for loop: descendants of ALGOL use "for", while descendants of Fortran use "do". There are other possibilities, for example COBOL which uses "PERFORM VARYING".

The name for-loop comes from the word for. For is used as the keyword in many programming languages to introduce a for-loop. The term in English dates to ALGOL 58 and was popularized in ALGOL 60. It is the direct translation of the earlier German  and was used in Superplan (1949–1951) by Heinz Rutishauser. Rutishauser was involved in defining ALGOL 58 and ALGOL 60.  The loop body is executed "for" the given values of the loop variable. This is more explicit in ALGOL versions of the for statement where a list of possible values and increments can be specified.

In Fortran and PL/I, the keyword DO is used for the same thing and it is called a do-loop; this is different from a do-while loop.

FOR 

A for-loop statement is available in most imperative programming languages. Even ignoring minor differences in syntax there are many differences in how these statements work and the level of expressiveness they support. Generally, for-loops fall into one of the following categories:

Traditional for-loops 
The for-loop of languages like ALGOL, Simula, BASIC, Pascal, Modula, Oberon, Ada, Matlab, Ocaml, F#, and so on, requires a control variable with start- and end-values, which looks something like this:
for i = first to last do statement
(* or just *)
for i = first..last do statement
Depending on the language, an explicit assignment sign may be used in place of the equal sign (and some languages require the word  even in the numerical case). An optional step-value (an increment or decrement ≠ 1) may also be included, although the exact syntaxes used for this differs a bit more between the languages. Some languages require a separate declaration of the control variable, some do not.

Another form was popularized by the C programming language. It requires 3 parts: the initialization (loop variant), the condition, and the advancement to the next iteration. All these three parts are optional. This type of "semicolon loops" came from B programming language and it was originally invented by Stephen Johnson.

In the initialization part, any variables needed are declared (and usually assigned values). If multiple variables are declared, they should all be of the same type. The condition part checks a certain condition and exits the loop if false, even if the loop is never executed. If the condition is true, then the lines of code inside the loop are executed. The advancement to the next iteration part is performed exactly once every time the loop ends. The loop is then repeated if the condition evaluates to true.

Here is an example of the C-style traditional for-loop in Java.

// Prints the numbers from 0 to 99 (and not 100), each followed by a space. 

for (int i=0; i<100; i++)  
{
    System.out.print(i);
    System.out.print(' ');
}
System.out.println();

These loops are also sometimes called numeric for-loops when contrasted with foreach loops (see below).

Iterator-based for-loops 

This type of for-loop is a generalisation of the numeric range type of for-loop, as it allows for the enumeration of sets of items other than number sequences. It is usually characterized by the use of an implicit or explicit iterator, in which the loop variable takes on each of the values in a sequence or other data collection. A representative example in Python is:

for item in some_iterable_object:
    do_something()
    do_something_else()

Where  is either a data collection that supports implicit iteration (like a list of employee's names), or may in fact be an iterator itself. Some languages have this in addition to another for-loop syntax; notably, PHP has this type of loop under the name , as well as a three-expression for-loop (see below) under the name .

Vectorised for-loops 
Some languages offer a for-loop that acts as if processing all iterations in parallel, such as the  keyword in FORTRAN 95 which has the interpretation that all right-hand-side expressions are evaluated before any assignments are made, as distinct from the explicit iteration form. In the  version, however, each calculation refers only to the original, unaltered .
 for     i := 2 : N - 1 do A(i) := [A(i - 1) + A(i) + A(i + 1)] / 3; next i;
 for all i := 2 : N - 1 do A(i) := [A(i - 1) + A(i) + A(i + 1)] / 3;
The difference may be significant.

Some languages (such as FORTRAN 95, PL/I) also offer array assignment statements, that enable many for-loops to be omitted. Thus pseudocode such as  would set all elements of array A to zero, no matter its size or dimensionality. The example loop could be rendered as 
 A(2 : N - 1) := [A(1 : N - 2) + A(2 : N - 1) + A(3 : N)] / 3;
But whether that would be rendered in the style of the for-loop or the for all-loop or something else may not be clearly described in the compiler manual.

Compound for-loops
Introduced with ALGOL 68 and followed by PL/I, this allows the iteration of a loop to be compounded with a test, as in
 for i := 1 : N while A(i) > 0 do etc.
That is, a value is assigned to the loop variable i and only if the while expression is true will the loop body be executed. If the result were false the for-loop's execution stops short. Granted that the loop variable's value is defined after the termination of the loop, then the above statement will find the first non-positive element in array A (and if no such, its value will be N + 1), or, with suitable variations, the first non-blank character in a string, and so on.

Loop counters 

In computer programming, a loop counter is a control variable that controls the iterations of a loop (a computer programming language construct).  It is so named because most uses of this construct result in the variable taking on a range of integer values in some orderly sequences (example., starting at 0 and end at 10 in increments of 1)

Loop counters change with each iteration of a loop, providing a unique value for each individual iteration. The loop counter is used to decide when the loop should terminate and for the program flow to continue to the next instruction after the loop.

A common identifier naming convention is for the loop counter to use the variable names i, j, and k (and so on if needed), where i would be the most outer loop, j the next inner loop, etc. The reverse order is also used by some programmers. This style is generally agreed to have originated from the early programming of Fortran, where these variable names beginning with these letters were implicitly declared as having an integer type, and so were obvious choices for loop counters that were only temporarily required. The practice dates back further to mathematical notation where indices for sums and multiplications are often i, j, etc. A variant convention is the use of duplicated letters for the index, ii, jj, and kk, as this allows easier searching and search-replacing than using a single letter.

Example
An example of C code involving nested for loops, where the loop counter variables are i and j:

for (i = 0; i < 100; i++) {
    for (j = i; j < 10; j++) {
        some_function(i, j);
    }
}

For loops in C can also be used to print the reverse of a word. As:
for (i = 0; i < 6; i++) {
    scanf("%c", &a[i]);
}
for (i = 4; i >= 0; i--) {
    printf("%c", a[i]);
}

Additional semantics and constructs

Use as infinite loops
This C-style for-loop is commonly the source of an infinite loop since the fundamental steps of iteration are completely in the control of the programmer. In fact, when infinite loops are intended, this type of for-loop can be used (with empty expressions), such as:

for (;;)
    //loop body

This style is used instead of infinite  loops to avoid a type conversion warning in some C/C++ compilers. Some programmers prefer the more succinct  form over the semantically equivalent but more verbose  form.

Early exit and continuation
Some languages may also provide other supporting statements, which when present can alter how the for-loop iteration proceeds.
Common among these are the break and continue statements found in C and its derivatives.
The break statement causes the inner-most loop to be terminated immediately when executed.
The continue statement will move at once to the next iteration without further progress through the loop body for the current iteration.
A for statement also terminates when a break, goto, or return statement within the statement body is executed. [Wells]
Other languages may have similar statements or otherwise provide means to alter the for-loop progress; for example in FORTRAN 95:

DO I = 1, N
  statements               !Executed for all values of "I", up to a disaster if any.
  IF (no good) CYCLE       !Skip this value of "I", continue with the next.
  statements               !Executed only where goodness prevails.
  IF (disaster) EXIT       !Abandon the loop.
  statements               !While good and, no disaster.
END DO                     !Should align with the "DO".

Some languages offer further facilities such as naming the various loop statements so that with multiple nested loops there is no doubt as to which loop is involved. Fortran 95, for example:
X1:DO I = 1,N
     statements
  X2:DO J = 1,M
       statements
       IF (trouble) CYCLE X1
       statements
     END DO X2
     statements
   END DO X1
Thus, when "trouble" is detected in the inner loop, the CYCLE X1 (not X2) means that the skip will be to the next iteration for I, not J. The compiler will also be checking that each END DO has the appropriate label for its position: this is not just a documentation aid. The programmer must still code the problem correctly, but some possible blunders will be blocked.

Loop variable scope and semantics
Different languages specify different rules for what value the loop variable will hold on termination of its loop, and indeed some hold that it "becomes undefined". This permits a compiler to generate code that leaves any value in the loop variable, or perhaps even leaves it unchanged because the loop value was held in a register and never stored to memory. Actual behaviour may even vary according to the compiler's optimization settings, as with the Honywell Fortran66 compiler.

In some languages (not C or C++) the loop variable is immutable within the scope of the loop body, with any attempt to modify its value being regarded as a semantic error. Such modifications are sometimes a consequence of a programmer error, which can be very difficult to identify once made. However, only overt changes are likely to be detected by the compiler. Situations where the address of the loop variable is passed as an argument to a subroutine make it very difficult to check, because the routine's behavior is in general unknowable to the compiler. Some examples in the style of Fortran:

DO I = 1, N
  I = 7                           !Overt adjustment of the loop variable. Compiler complaint likely.
  Z = ADJUST(I)                   !Function "ADJUST" might alter "I", to uncertain effect.
  normal statements               !Memory might fade that "I" is the loop variable.
  PRINT (A(I), B(I), I = 1, N, 2) !Implicit for-loop to print odd elements of arrays A and B, reusing "I"...
  PRINT I                         !What value will be presented?
END DO                            !How many times will the loop be executed?

However, adjustments to the value of  within the loop will not change the number of iterations executed.

For instance, within the loop a reference to element  of an array would likely employ the auxiliary variable (especially if it were held in a machine register), but if  is a parameter to some routine (for instance, a print-statement to reveal its value), it would likely be a reference to the proper variable  instead. It is best to avoid such possibilities.

Adjustment of bounds
Just as the index variable might be modified within a for-loop, so also may its bounds and direction. But to uncertain effect. A compiler may prevent such attempts, they may have no effect, or they might even work properly - though many would declare that to do so would be wrong. Consider a statement such as 
 for i := first : last : step do
   A(i) := A(i) / A(last);

List of value ranges
PL/I and Algol 68, allows loops in which the loop variable is iterated over a list of ranges of values instead of a single range. The following PL/I example will execute the loop with six values of i: 1, 7, 12, 13, 14, 15:
do i = 1, 7, 12 to 15;
  /*statements*/
end;

Equivalence with while-loops 

A for-loop is generally equivalent to a while-loop:

 factorial := 1
  for counter from 2 to 5
      factorial := factorial * counter
 counter := counter - 1
 print counter + "! equals " + factorial

is equivalent to:

 factorial := 1
 counter := 1
  while counter < 5
     counter := counter + 1
     factorial := factorial * counter
 print counter + "! equals " + factorial    

as demonstrated by the output of the variables.

Timeline of the for-loop syntax in various programming languages 
Given an action that must be repeated, for instance, five times, different languages' for-loops will be written differently. The syntax for a three-expression for-loop is nearly identical in all languages that have it, after accounting for different styles of block termination and so on.

1957: FORTRAN
Fortran's equivalent of the  loop is the  loop, 
using the keyword do instead of for, 
The syntax of Fortran's  loop is:
        DO label counter = first, last, step
          statements
label     statement 
The following two examples behave equivalently to the three argument for-loop in other languages, 
initializing the counter variable to 1, incrementing by 1 each iteration of the loop and stopping at five (inclusive).
        DO 9, COUNTER = 1, 5, 1
          WRITE (6,8) COUNTER
    8     FORMAT( I2 )
    9   CONTINUE
In Fortran 77 (or later), this may also be written as: 
do counter = 1, 5
  write(*, '(i2)') counter
end do
The step part may be omitted if the step is one. Example:
* DO loop example.
       PROGRAM MAIN
         SUM SQ = 0
         DO 199 I = 1, 9999999
           IF (SUM SQ.GT.1000) GO TO 200
199        SUM SQ = SUM SQ + I**2
200      PRINT 206, SUMSQ
206      FORMAT( I2 )
       END
In the modern free-form Fortran style, blanks are significant.

In Fortran 90, the  may be avoided by using an  statement.
* DO loop example.
       program main
         implicit none

         integer :: sumsq
         integer :: i

         sumsq = 0
         do i = 1, 9999999
           if (sumsq > 1000.0) exit
           sumsq = sumsq + i**2
          end do
         print *, sumsq

       end program

1958: ALGOL
ALGOL 58 introduced the  statement, using the form as Superplan:

  FOR Identifier = Base (Difference) Limit

For example to print 0 to 10 incremented by 1:
FOR x = 0 (1) 10 BEGIN
PRINT (FL) = x END

1960: COBOL
COBOL was formalized in late 1959 and has had many elaborations. It uses the PERFORM verb which has many options.  Originally all loops had to be out-of-line with the iterated code occupying a separate paragraph. Ignoring the need for declaring and initialising variables, the COBOL equivalent of a for-loop would be.

      PERFORM SQ-ROUTINE VARYING I FROM 1 BY 1 UNTIL I > 1000

      SQ-ROUTINE
             ADD I**2 TO SUM-SQ.

In the 1980s the addition of in-line loops and "structured" statements such as END-PERFORM resulted in a for-loop with a more familiar structure.

      PERFORM VARYING I FROM 1 BY 1 UNTIL I > 1000
             ADD I**2 TO SUM-SQ.
      END-PERFORM
If the PERFORM verb has the optional clause TEST AFTER, the resulting loop is slightly different: the loop body is executed at least once, before any test.

1964: BASIC
Loops in BASIC are sometimes called for-next loops.

10 REM THIS FOR LOOP PRINTS ODD NUMBERS FROM 1 TO 15
20 FOR I = 1 TO 15 STEP 2
30 PRINT I
40 NEXT I
Notice that the end-loop marker specifies the name of the index variable, which must correspond to the name of the index variable in the start of the for-loop. Some languages (PL/I, FORTRAN 95 and later) allow a statement label on the start of a for-loop that can be matched by the compiler against the same text on the corresponding end-loop statement. However, in these languages the labels must be unique, so successive loops involving the same index variable cannot use the same text nor can a label be the same as the name of a variable, such as the index variable for the loop.

1964: PL/I
do counter = 1 to 5 by 1; /* "by 1" is the default if not specified */
  /*statements*/;
  end;

The  statement may be used to exit the loop. Loops can be labeled, and leave may leave a specific labeled loop in a group of nested loops. Some PL/I dialects include the  statement to terminate the current loop iteration and begin the next.

1968: Algol 68
ALGOL 68 has what was considered the universal loop, the full syntax is:
FOR i FROM 1 BY 2 TO 3 WHILE i≠4 DO ~ OD

Further, the single iteration range could be replaced by a list of such ranges. There are several unusual aspects of the construct
 only the  portion was compulsory, in which case the loop will iterate indefinitely.
 thus the clause , will iterate exactly 100 times.
 the  syntactic element allowed a programmer to break from a  loop early, as in:
INT sum sq := 0;
FOR i
 WHILE
  print(("So far:", i, new line)); # Interposed for tracing purposes. #
  sum sq ≠ 70↑2                    # This is the test for the WHILE   #
DO
  sum sq +:= i↑2
OD

The same compilers also incorporated:
 for late loop termination.
 for working on arrays in parallel.

1970: Pascal
for Counter := 1 to 5 do
  (*statement*);

for Counter := 5 downto 1 do
  (*statement*);

The numeric-range for-loop varies somewhat more.

1972: C/C++

for (initialization; condition; increment/decrement)
    statement
The  is often a block statement; an example of this would be:
//Using for-loops to add numbers 1 - 5
int sum = 0;
for (int i = 1; i <= 5; ++i) {
    sum += i;
}
The ISO/IEC 9899:1999 publication (commonly known as C99) also allows initial declarations in  loops. All the three sections in the for loop are optional, with an empty condition equivalent to true.

1972: Smalltalk
1 to: 5 do: [ :counter | "statements" ]
Contrary to other languages, in Smalltalk a for-loop is not a language construct but defined in the class Number as a method with two parameters, the end value and a closure, using self as start value.

1980: Ada
for Counter in 1 .. 5 loop
   -- statements
end loop;

The exit statement may be used to exit the loop. Loops can be labeled, and exit may leave a specifically labeled loop in a group of nested loops:
Counting:
    for Counter in 1 .. 5 loop
   Triangle:
       for Secondary_Index in 2 .. Counter loop
          -- statements
          exit Counting;
          -- statements
       end loop Triangle;
    end loop Counting;

1980: Maple

Maple has two forms of for-loop, one for iterating of a range of values, and the other for iterating over the contents of a container. The value range form is as follows:

 for i from f by b to t while w do
     # loop body
 od;

All parts except do and od are optional. The for i part, if present, must come first. The remaining parts (from f, by b, to t, while w) can appear in any order.

Iterating over a container is done using this form of loop:

 for e in c while w do
     # loop body
 od;

The in c clause specifies the container, which may be a list, set, sum, product, unevaluated function, array, or an object implementing an iterator.

A for-loop may be terminated by od, end, or end do.

1982: Maxima CAS
In Maxima CAS one can use also non integer values : 
for x:0.5 step 0.1 thru 0.9 do
    /* "Do something with x" */

1982: PostScript
The for-loop, written as  initialises an internal variable, executes the body as long as the internal variable is not more than limit (or not less, if increment is negative) and, at the end of each iteration, increments the internal variable. Before each iteration, the value of the internal variable is pushed onto the stack.
1 1 6 {STATEMENTS} for
There is also a simple repeat-loop.
5 { STATEMENTS } repeat

1983: Ada 83 and above
procedure Main is
  Sum_Sq : Integer := 0;
begin
  for I in 1 .. 9999999 loop 
    if Sum_Sq <= 1000 then
      Sum_Sq := Sum_Sq + I**2
    end if;
  end loop;
end;

1984: MATLAB
for n = 1:5 
     -- statements
end
After the loop,  would be 5 in this example.

As  is used for the Imaginary unit, its use as a loop variable is discouraged.

1987: Perl
for ($counter = 1; $counter <= 5; $counter++) { # implicitly or predefined variable
    # statements;
}
for (my $counter = 1; $counter <= 5; $counter++) { # variable private to the loop
    # statements;
}
for (1..5) { # variable implicitly called $_; 1..5 creates a list of these 5 elements
    # statements;
}
statement for 1..5; # almost same (only 1 statement) with natural language order
for my $counter (1..5) { # variable private to the loop
    # statements;
}

(Note that "there's more than one way to do it" is a Perl programming motto.)

1988: Mathematica

The construct corresponding to most other languages' for-loop is called Do in Mathematica

Do[f[x], {x, 0, 1, 0.1}]

Mathematica also has a For construct that mimics the for-loop of C-like languages

For[x= 0 , x <= 1, x += 0.1,
    f[x]
]

1989: Bash
# first form
for i in 1 2 3 4 5
do
    # must have at least one command in loop
    echo $i  # just print value of i
done

# second form
for (( i = 1; i <= 5; i++ ))
do
    # must have at least one command in loop
    echo $i  # just print value of i
done

If the above loops contained only comments, execution would result in the message "syntax error near unexpected token 'done'".

1990: Haskell
The built-in imperative forM_ maps a monadic expression into a list, as 
forM_ [1..5] $ \indx -> do statements

or get each iteration result as a list in
statements_result_list <- forM [1..5] $ \indx -> do statements

But, if you want to save the space of the [1..5] list,
a more authentic monadic forLoop_ construction can be defined as

import Control.Monad as M

forLoopM_ :: Monad m => a -> (a -> Bool) -> (a -> a) -> (a -> m) -> m
forLoopM_ indx prop incr f = do
        f indx
        M.when (prop next) $ forLoopM_ next prop incr f
  where      
    next = incr indx    
and used as:
  forLoopM_ (0::Int) (< len) (+1) $ \indx -> do -- whatever with the index

1991: Oberon-2, Oberon-07, or Component Pascal
FOR Counter := 1 TO 5 DO
  (* statement sequence *)
END
Note that in the original Oberon language the for-loop was omitted in favor of the more general Oberon loop construct. The for-loop was reintroduced in Oberon-2.

1991: Python
Python does not contain the classical for loop, rather a foreach loop is used to iterate over the output of the built-in range() function which returns an iterable sequence of integers.for i in range(1, 6):  # gives i values from 1 to 5 inclusive (but not 6)
    # statements
    print(i)
# if we want 6 we must do the following
for i in range(1, 6 + 1):  # gives i values from 1 to 6
    # statements
    print(i)Using range(6) would run the loop from 0 to 5.

1993: AppleScript
repeat with i from 1 to 5
	-- statements
	log i
end repeat

You can also iterate through a list of items, similar to what you can do with arrays in other languages:
set x to {1, "waffles", "bacon", 5.1, false}
repeat with i in x
	log i
end repeat

You may also use  to exit a loop at any time. Unlike other languages, AppleScript does not currently have any command to continue to the next iteration of a loop.

1993: Crystal
for i = start, stop, interval do
  -- statements
end

So, this code for i = 1, 5, 2 do
  print(i)
end will print:
1 3 5

For-loops can also loop through a table using ipairs() to iterate numerically through arrays and pairs() to iterate randomly through dictionaries.
Generic for-loop making use of closures:

for name, phone, address in contacts() do
  -- contacts() must be an iterator function
end

1995: CFML

Script syntax
Simple index loop:
for (i = 1; i <= 5; i++) {
	// statements
}

Using an array:
for (i in [1,2,3,4,5]) {
	// statements
}

Using a list of string values:
loop index="i" list="1;2,3;4,5" delimiters=",;" {
	// statements
}

The above  example is only available in the dialect of CFML used by Lucee and Railo.

Tag syntax
Simple index loop:
<cfloop index="i" from="1" to="5">
	<!--- statements --->
</cfloop>

Using an array:
<cfloop index="i" array="#[1,2,3,4,5]#">
	<!--- statements --->
</cfloop>

Using a "list" of string values:
<cfloop index="i" list="1;2,3;4,5" delimiters=",;">
	<!--- statements --->
</cfloop>

1995: Java 
for (int i = 0; i < 5; i++) {
    //perform functions within the loop;
    //can use the statement 'break;' to exit early;
    //can use the statement 'continue;' to skip the current iteration
}

For the extended for-loop, see .

1995: JavaScript
JavaScript supports C-style "three-expression" loops. The  and  statements are supported inside loops.

for (var i = 0; i < 5; i++) {
    // ...
}

Alternatively, it is possible to iterate over all keys of an array.

for (var key in array) {  // also works for assoc. arrays
    // use array[key]
    ...
}

1995: PHP
This prints out a triangle of *
for ($i = 0; $i <= 5; $i++) {
    for ($j = 0; $j <= $i; $j++) {
        echo "*";
    }
    echo "<br />\n";
}

1995: Ruby
for counter in 1..5
  # statements
end

5.times do |counter|  # counter iterates from 0 to 4
  # statements
end

1.upto(5) do |counter|
  # statements
end
Ruby has several possible syntaxes, including the above samples.

1996: OCaml
See expression syntax.
 (* for_statement := "for" ident '='  expr  ( "to" ∣  "downto" ) expr "do" expr "done" *)

for i = 1 to 5 do
    (* statements *)
  done ;;

for j = 5 downto 0 do
    (* statements *)
  done ;;

1998: ActionScript 3
for (var counter:uint = 1; counter <= 5; counter++){
    //statement;
}

2008: Small Basic
For i = 1 To 10
    ' Statements
EndFor

2008: Nim
Nim has a foreach-type loop and various operations for creating iterators.
for i in 5 .. 10:
  # statements

2009: Go
for i := 0; i <= 10; i++ {
    // statements
}

2010: Rust
for i in 0..10 {
    // statements
}

2012: Julia
for j = 1:10
    # statements
end

See also 
 Do while loop
 Foreach
 While loop

References 

Articles with example Ada code
Articles with example ALGOL 68 code
Articles with example C code
Articles with example Fortran code
Articles with example Perl code
Iteration in programming
Articles with example Python (programming language) code